Valérie Cazeneuve called Ève de Castro (1961) is a French writer, novelist and screenwriter, a winner of the Prix des libraires in 1992, the Prix des Deux Magots and the Prix Maurice Genevoix in 1996.

Work

Novels 
1987: Les Bâtards du soleil, éditions Orban
1991: La Galigaï, éditions Orban
1992: Ayez pitié du cœur des hommes, éditions Jean-Claude Lattès – Prix des libraires
1994: Soleils amers, éditions Jean-Claude Lattès
1996: Nous serons comme des dieux, Albin Michel – Prix des Deux Magots and Prix Maurice Genevoix
1998: Le Soir et le Matin suivant, éditions Albin Michel
2001: Le Peseur d'âme, éditions Albin Michel
2006: La Trahison de l'ange, éditions Robert Laffont
2010: Cet homme-là, éditions Robert Laffont
2013: Enfant roi, Plon
2014: Joujou, éditions Robert Laffont
2015: Nous, Louis, roi, éditions L'Iconoclaste

Scripts 
2000: Le Roi danse by Gérard Corbiau (in collaboration with Gérard and Andrée Corbiau)
2010:  (TV) by Raoul Peck (in collaboration with )
2011: Fort comme la mort (TV) by Gilles Banier

External links 
 Interview. Ève de Castro : Un regard différent sur la fin de Louis XIV
 "Enfant roi", d'Eve de Castro interview 

20th-century French non-fiction writers
21st-century French non-fiction writers
French women screenwriters
French screenwriters
Prix des libraires winners
Prix des Deux Magots winners
1961 births
Living people
20th-century French women writers
21st-century French women writers